Michael Elwyn (born 23 August 1942) is a Welsh actor, notable for his work in film (Shadow Man), stage (The Audience, as Anthony Eden) and television (Stella).

Elwyn was born in Pontypridd. He is the partner of actress Alison Steadman, and is best known for his role as Sir Edward in the BBC Series of Robin Hood. In 2020 Elwyn joined the cast of Coronation Street playing 'Charles Moore' Resident Chair of 'Stillwaters'.

Filmography

TV

Film

Stage

References

External links
 

1942 births
Welsh male film actors
Welsh male stage actors
Welsh male television actors
Living people